Popular Favorites 1976–1992: Sand in the Vaseline is a two-disc compilation album released by Talking Heads in 1992. It contains two previously unreleased demo recordings ("Sugar on My Tongue," "I Want to Live"), a non-album a-side ("Love → Building on Fire") and b-side ("I Wish You Wouldn't Say That") and three newly finished songs ("Gangster of Love," "Lifetime Piling Up" and "Popsicle"). The latter three tracks were all based on unreleased outtakes from previous studio sessions and had been  finished for exclusive release on this compilation.

The album was also available as a three disc LP set at the time of release.

The album's title and cover art incorporated the 1974 painting by Ed Ruscha, Sand in the Vaseline.

Track listing

Charts

References

Albums produced by Brian Eno
Albums produced by Steve Lillywhite
Albums produced by Nick Launay
Albums produced by Tony Bongiovi
Albums produced by Jerry Harrison
Albums produced by David Byrne
Albums produced by Chris Frantz
Albums produced by Tina Weymouth
Talking Heads compilation albums
1992 compilation albums
Sire Records compilation albums